Ambika (Devanagari: अम्बिका, IAST: Ambikā) is generally the name of Adi Shakti, Shakti or Durga, the consort of Sadashiva, the Cosmic Male. She has eight arms, holding multiple weapons. She is also known as Bhagavati or Chandi. She is also considered to be Adi Parashakti herself and Mother of the Universe as well as all beings, which is also the meaning of the name "Ambika". In Skanda Puran, she slayed the demons Shumbha and Nishumbha. She is also identified as Amba, Durga, Bhagavati, Lalitambika, Bhavani, Ambe Maa, Sherawaali, Mata Raani, etc.

Manifestations and aspects of Ambika
In Srimad Devi Bhagavata, Ambika is the lineal progenitor of all other goddesses. She is worshiped as one with many forms and names. Her form or incarnation depends on her mood. For example:

 Sati is an aspect of Ambika who is the first wife of Lord Shiva, who immolated herself. She is also known as Dakshayini.
 Bhadrakali is one of the fiercest forms of Ambika. She destroyed the yagna of Daksha Prajapati.
 Parvati is the complete incarnation of Ambika, also known as Gauri and Uma. She is the wife of Lord Shiva.
 Durga is a demon-fighting form of Parvati who killed the demon Durgamasura.
 Kali is another ferocious form of Parvati, as the goddess of time and change, with Vedic origins in the deity Nirriti.
 Chandi is the epithet of Durga, considered to be the power of Ambika; she is black in color and rides on a lion, slayer of the demon Mahishasura.
 Ten Mahavidyas are the ten aspects of Shakti. In tantra, all are important different aspects of Mahakali.
 52 Shakti Peethas suggests all goddesses are expansions of the goddess Shakti.
 Navadurga, the nine forms of the goddess Durga.
Matrikas, a group of seven mother-goddesses
 Meenakshi, the goddess with eyes shaped like a fish.
 Kamakshi, goddess of love and devotion.
 Lalita, the playful Goddess of the Universe; she is the highest form of the Devi .
 Akilandeswari, found in coastal regions of India, is the goddess associated with water.
 Annapurna is the representation of all that is complete and of food. She is a form of Shakti 
 The 64 yoginis are 64 forms or aspects of Goddess Durga.

See also
Ambika (Jainism) - Yakshi of the 22nd Tirthankara Neminatha, portrayed with children in sculpture.

References

Destroyer goddesses
Hindu goddesses
War goddesses
Shaktism